Clarence Edwin Meyer (October 17, 1936 – March 15, 2014) was an American football player. An offensive tackle and guard, he played professionally in the American Football League for the Buffalo Bills.

College football
Meyer played college football at West Texas State, and played in the Tangerine Bowl and the Copper Bowl All-Star Game while there.  He was inducted into the West Texas A&M Hall of Champions in 2010.

Professional
He was drafted by the New York Titans, and signed with the Pittsburgh Steelers of the National Football League before going to the Buffalo Bills.

1936 births
2014 deaths
People from Shidler, Oklahoma
Players of American football from Oklahoma
American football offensive tackles
American football offensive guards
West Texas A&M Buffaloes football players
Buffalo Bills players
American Football League players